Sheikh Chor شیخ چوڑ is a small village in Tehsil Ghazi تحصیل غازی in Hazara Division ہزارہ of Haripur District ضِلع ہری پور of Khyber Pakhtunkhwa خیبر پختونخوا  province of Pakistan پاکستان with a population of about 2000. Sheikh Chor is the first or last village of Tehsil Ghazi (depending on which way you travel) bordering with Jilalia (Tehsil Hazro, Punjab.) It is known as one of the smallest villages in Tehsil Ghazi with about 110 households. Sheikh Chor is also known as an agricultural town which produces wheat, tobacco, and corn in addition to vegetables and fruits.

Official spelling: Sheikh Chor

Language Spoken: Hindko

Literary rate: 60% Percent

Welfare: Sheikh Chor Welfare Committee has been helping the less fortunate in the village since 2013. Committee helps individuals in wedding cost, hospital visits, funeral & burial ceremony, ramadan food package etc.

Location
The village is located at 33°58'18N 72°33'20E with an altitude of 321 metres (1053 feet). 1 km north is the Indus River, 1 km to the east are Naqarchian and Mian Dheri villages, 2 km south is Ghorghushti, 1 km west is Jalalia and Capital of Pakistan Islamabad being 90 km south east and Peshawar State Capital of Khyber Pakhtunkhwa being 110 km north west respectively.

References
http://www.fallingrain.com/world/PK/03/Shekh_Chuhr.html

Populated places in Haripur District